Stefan Lex (born 27 November 1989) is a German professional footballer who plays as a winger for  club 1860 Munich.

References

External links
 
 

1989 births
Living people
People from Erding (district)
Sportspeople from Upper Bavaria
Association football wingers
German footballers
Bundesliga players
2. Bundesliga players
TSV Buchbach players
SpVgg Greuther Fürth players
FC Ingolstadt 04 players
TSV 1860 Munich players
3. Liga players
Footballers from Bavaria